The following is a list of Creighton Bluejays men's basketball head coaches. There have been 16 head coaches of the Bluejays in their 104-season history.

Creighton's current head coach is Greg McDermott. He was hired as the Bluejays' head coach in April 2010, replacing Dana Altman, who left to become the head coach at Oregon.

References

Creighton

Creighton Bluejays basketball head coaches